The 2022–2023 mpox outbreak in South Africa is a part of the larger outbreak of human mpox caused by the West African clade of the monkeypox virus. South Africa was the forty-seventh country, outside of the African countries with endemic mpox, to experience an outbreak in 2022. The first case of mpox in South Africa was on June 23rd, 2022.

Background 

An ongoing outbreak of mpox was confirmed on 6 May 2022, beginning with a British resident who, after travelling to Nigeria (where the disease is endemic), presented symptoms consistent with mpox on 29 April 2022. The resident returned to the United Kingdom on 4 May, creating the country's index case of the outbreak. The origin of several of the cases of mpox in the United Kingdom is unknown. Some monitors saw community transmission taking place in the London area as of mid-May, but it has been suggested that cases were already spreading in Europe in the previous months.

Transmission 

A large portion of those infected were believed to have not recently traveled to areas of Africa where mpox is normally found, such as Nigeria, the Democratic Republic of the Congo as well as central and western Africa. It is believed to be transmitted by close contact with sick people, with extra caution for those individuals with lesions on their skin or genitals, along with their bedding and clothing. The CDC has also stated that individuals should avoid contact and consumption of dead animals such as rats, squirrels, monkeys and apes along with wild game or lotions derived from animals in Africa.

In addition to more common symptoms, such as fever, headache, swollen lymph nodes, and rashes or lesions, some patients have also experienced proctitis, an inflammation of the rectum lining. CDC has also warned clinicians to not rule out mpox in patients with sexually transmitted infections since there have been reports of co-infections with syphilis, gonorrhea, chlamydia, and herpes.

History 

The first known case of mpox in South Africa was detected on Thursday, 23 June 2022 declared by the health minister of South Africa Joe Phaahla. The first victim was a 30 year old man who had no recent travel history, meaning that he has not contacted the disease outside the country.
5 days later on the 28th of June, South Africa confirmed its second case of mpox. The victim also had no recent travel history. On 11 July 2022 South Africa confirmed third case of mpox, the 42 year old is a tourist from Switzerland who came to South Africa to enjoy his holidays. On the second week of August 2022 Minister of Health South Africa announced the 4th case of mpox in South Africa the victim recently arrived from Spain.

See also
 2022–2023 mpox outbreak in Asia
 2022–2023 mpox outbreak in Europe
 2022–2023 mpox outbreak in Canada
 2022–2023 mpox outbreak in Germany
 2022–2023 mpox outbreak in the Netherlands
 2022–2023 mpox outbreak in Portugal
 2022–2023 mpox outbreak in Spain
 2022–2023 mpox outbreak in the United Kingdom
 2022–2023 mpox outbreak in the United States
 Mpox in Nigeria
 Mpox in the Democratic Republic of the Congo

Notes

References

South Africa
Mpox
Mpox